Mun of Balhae (r. 737–793), also known as  Dae Heum-mu, was the third and longest-reigning ruler of the Balhae. He succeeded his father King Mu, upon his death in 737. He is the grandson of Dae jo yeong the founder of Balhae.

Reign
During King Mun's reign, diplomatic ties with the Tang dynasty were established, and many Balhae scholars went to the Tang to study, extending the influence of Buddhism and Confucianism in Balhae's governance. He also strengthened relations with Silla, which unified the Korean peninsula to the south of Balhae, overseeing the development of the trade route called Silla-road (Hangul: 신라도, Hanja: 新羅道). Balhae also increased diplomacy and trade with Japan.

King Mun moved the capital of Balhae several times (Sanggyeong and Donggyeong), stabilizing and strengthening central rule over various ethnic tribes in his realm, which was expanded temporarily. He also authorized the creation of the Jujagam (Hangul: 주자감, Hanja: 胄子監), the national academy, based on the national academy of Tang.

Although the Tang dynasty recognized him as a king, Balhae itself referred to him as the Daeheung Boryeok Hyogam Geumryun Seongbeop Daewang (Hangul: 대흥보력효감금륜성법대왕, 大興寶曆孝感金輪聖法大王), Gadokbu (Hangul: 가독부, Hanja: 可毒夫), Seongwang (Hangul: 성왕, Hanja: 聖王) and Giha (Hangul: 기하, Hanja: 基下), Balhae itself referred to him as the posterity of heaven and an emperor.

The tomb of his fourth daughter, Princess Jeonghyo, was discovered in 1980. The tombstone of his elder daughter, Princess Jeonghye, has also been found.

Era names
Daeheung (대흥 大興 Great Happiness, 737-774, ?-793)
Boryeok (보력 寶曆, 774-?, at least until 781)

Family
Father: Dae Muye, King Mu (무왕 대무예, 武王 大武藝)
Grandfather: Dae Joyeong, King Go (고왕 대조영, 高王 大祚榮)
Wife: Empress Hyoui (효의황후, 孝懿皇后)
1st son: Dae Goengrim (대굉림, 大宏臨) – father of Dae Hwayeo, King Seong (성왕 대화여, 成王 大華璵)
2nd son: Dae Yeongjun (대영준, 大英俊)
3rd son: Dae Jeongal (대정알, 大貞斡)
4th son: Dae Sungrin, King Gang (강왕 대숭린, 康王 大嵩璘)
unknown 1st daughter; died prematurely
2nd daughter: Princess Jeonghye (정혜공주, 貞惠公主; 737–777)
3rd daughter: Princess Jeongyeon (정연공주)
4th daughter: Princess Jeonghyo (정효공주, 貞孝公主; 757–792)

See also
List of Korean monarchs
History of Korea

References

External links
 Britannica Korea article 
 Balhae era poem and extensive historical background 
 KCNA article on the two tombs of Dae Heummu's daughters 
 The extension of Balhae Kingdom under King Mun 

793 deaths
Year of birth missing
Balhae rulers
Mohe peoples
8th-century rulers in Asia
Korean Buddhist monarchs